Niño is a 2014 Philippine television drama series broadcast by GMA Network. It premiered on the network's Telebabad line up from May 26, 2014 to September 12, 2014, replacing Carmela: Ang Pinakamagandang Babae sa Mundong Ibabaw.

Mega Manila ratings are provided by AGB Nielsen Philippines.

Series overview

Episodes

May 2014

June 2014

July 2014

August 2014

September 2014

References

Lists of Philippine drama television series episodes